Bibirevo District  is an administrative district (raion) of North-Eastern Administrative Okrug near Moscow Ring Road, and one of the 125 raions of Moscow, Russia.

History
The area is named after the village of Bibirevo, known to have existed since at least the end of the 16th century. Until 1774 the village and the lands around it belonged to the Ascension Convent, based Dmitry Donskoy and his wife Grand Duchess Eudoxia. The monastery was located on the territory of the Moscow Kremlin and in the summer nuns traveled to Bibirevo. In 1774 the village came under the jurisdiction of the State College of economy, and peasants became state owned.

The  was consecrated in 1894 in gratitude to God for the deliverance of the villagers from cholera. The temple was set flush with the wooden church of the Annunciation of the Virgin, known from the 16th century.
In 1852 in the village there were 164 farmers, 36 yards, 1 church. In 1960 was included in the Dzerzhinsky district of Moscow. Since the late 1960s its territory was subject to mass housing construction. In 1967 Bibirevo became part of the Kirovsky Raion. In 1991, after the administrative reform of some of it became separate administrative unit bearing the same name, and some - to "Altufievskoe".

See also
Administrative divisions of Moscow

References

Notes

Sources
 http://bibirevo-svao.ru/index.php/2010-11-17-13-15-49
 Бибирево оказалось нечисто на реку | Новости СВАО Москвы

Districts of Moscow
North-Eastern Administrative Okrug